Dasa Sahitya is the literature of bhakti movement composed by devotees in honor of Lord Vishnu or one of his Avatars. Dasa is literally servant in Kannada and sahitya is literature. Haridasas ("servants of God") were preachers of bhakti to Lord Vishnu or one of his avatars. The bhakti literature of these Haridasas is collectively referred to as Dasa Sahitya. It is in the Kannada language. Dasas are Dvaita scholars and poets.

The Haridasas contributed to the rich heritage of Karntataka music. They made an indelible impression on the religious and cultural life of Karnataka. They spread the didactic teachings in a musical form to the hearts of the common man. Like other doyens of Indian classical music, these scholars offered pooja to Vishnu through music, called naadopasana. The Lord is described as Samagana priya; bhakti through music is the most preferred path to 'reach' him.

The Haridasa compositions are popularly known as Devaranamas. Compositions like Venkatachala Nilayam, Jagadoddharana, Tamboori meetidava, Krishna Nee Begane Baaro are some of the many examples of their scholarly work.

Although the association of the Dasas is with Vishnu, they composed songs on other forms of Hindu Gods, also known as Saguna Brahma Swaroopa(s). Purandaradasa for example, has composed songs in praise of Ganapathi (Gajavadana Beduve), Shiva (Chandra chuda Shiva Shankara), and Saraswathi (Kodubega Divyamati Saraswati).

Composers of Dasa sahitya
Naraharitirtha (Direct Shishya of Madhvacharya and founder of Yakshagana art)
Sripadaraja
Vyasatirtha.
Vadirajatirtha
Raghavendra Tirtha
Purandaradasa, popularly known as Karnataka sangeeta pitamaha or " Grand Father of Carnatic music"
Kanakadasa.
Vijaya Dasa.
Gopaladasaru.
Jagannathadasaru
 Mahipati Dasa
 Surapurada Ananda Dasa (Kamalesha Vithala Dasu)
 Helavanakatte Giriyamma
 Pandurangi Huchacharya (Indiresha Dasa)
 Shyama Sundara Dasa
 Harappanahalli Bheemavva
 Karjagi Dasaru (Srida Vithala)
and many more

External links
 Complete Dasa sahitya 
Dasa Sahitya or Slave Literature by Dr. Jyotnsa Kamat
Android App with more than 15000 dasara padagalu 

Carnatic music
Hindu music
Literature of Karnataka
Haridasa